Childqueen is the second studio album by American musician Kadhja Bonet. It was released on June 8, 2018 under Fat Possum Records.

Production
The album was recorded over a two-year period in cities across Europe.

Release
On March 30, 2018, Bonet announced the release of her second album, along with the single "Mother Maybe".

The second single "Another Time Lover" was released on May 29, 2018. The single is described as blending "subtle distorted electronica with Bonet's delicate vocals, as it daintily morphs into a retro-tinged track.

Critical reception
Childqueen was met with "universal acclaim" reviews from critics. At Metacritic, which assigns a weighted average rating out of 100 to reviews from mainstream publications, this release received an average score of 82 based on 10 reviews. Aggregator Album of the Year gave the release a 79 out of 100 based on a critical consensus of 12 reviews.

Andy Kellman of AllMusic said the album "mixes folk and soul to spellbinding effect, provoking numerous flattering comparisons yet without possibly being mistaken for any one of them. Illustrated with billowing strings and dancing woodwinds over a delightfully warped rhythm section." Speaking for Exclaim!, Anna Alger gave the album nine out of ten, noting "Childqueen demands patience and a receptive ear to pick up on the care and detail Bonet has taken in crafting every moment."

Accolades

Track listing

Charts

References

2018 albums
Fat Possum Records albums